Hutchinson Senior High School was founded in the fall of 1877 in Hutchinson, Minnesota, United States. The school has over 12,000 graduates since its inception. The first graduating class included H. H. Bonniwell.

Today, HHS graduates anywhere from 200-240 graduates per year. This rate has held fairly steady for the past 50 years. The first class over 100 was in 1942 (110) and the first class of 200 students occurred 23 years later in 1965. The last graduating class under 200 was in 1992. Over that time, Hutchinson HS has had a remarkably stable population of between 800-1100 students. Currently, the enrollment of Hutchinson HS is above 900 and expects to be there through the near future. A new remodeled high school debuted during the 2017-2018 school year.

History 
 The first HHS graduates were in 1878. High school education generally was exclusive to private tutoring prior to this. 
 In 1881, the Hutchinson school district became one of the first to receive state money to provide high school study. 
 In 1890, the Hutchinson school district had 529 pupils, while only graduating 4 students. High school education did not gain popularity until the turn of the century. 
 In 1913, a Normal School was started. The normal school took place in the summer after graduation and allowed many people to become certified teachers in a six-week program. 50% of the graduating class went to the Normal school in 1915-17. The Normal School continued to operate until 1947. During this period, the teacher training school graduated 10-15 students yearly. 
 The first documented valedictorian was E. R. Dennis in the Class of 1912. The practice of naming a valedictorian and salutatorian was ended by Principal Scott Douglas in the year 2000.

Graduation classes

Notable alumni 
 Carlos Avery (1868-1930), first Commissioner of the Minnesota Game and Fish Commission. Namesake of the Carlos Avery State Wildlife Management Area. Class of 1887.
 John Bernhagen, Minnesota Legislator, (1969-1992). Class of 1952. Graduated #12 in his class of 82.  
 Harlow "Bonnie" Bonniwell, Minnesota Legislator (1915-1935). Part of the first graduating class in 1878.
 Mitch Erickson, Offensive Guard at South Dakota State from 2004-2007, Pro football player from 2008-2012 in the NFL (Practice Squad) and CFL
 Colleen Gray, (née Delores Jensen) big screen actress from the 1940s and 1950s. Class of 1939. Graduated #3 in her class of 82. 
 Arthur A. Hahn, Minnesota state senator and businessman
 Les Kouba, 1957–58 and 1967-68 Federal Duck Stamp winner and celebrated wildlife artist. Les was in the Class of 1935, but left school during his jr year to attend art school in Minneapolis. Les Kouba Art
 Greg Murtha, Football player at the University of Minnesota, played in the NFL in 1982 NFL Page
 Lydon Murtha, Offensive Tackle at Nebraska from 2005-2008, NFL Player with the Miami Dolphins
 Harold Popp, Minnesota Legislator (1958-1969). Pharmacist. Married popular teacher Winnifred Ruth in 1941. Both were killed in a car accident in 1969. Class of 1921 
 Nate Swift, Record-setting receiver at Nebraska from 2005-2008, NFL Practice Squad player, Denver and Jacksonville (2009)
 Lindsay Whalen, head coach of the University of Minnesota's women's basketball team
 John Zeleny, Class of 1888, BS Cambridge, University of MN Physicist 1906-1951, invented Zeleny Electroscope, President, American Physical Society, 1940

Feeder schools 
 West Elementary
 Tiger Elementary
 Park Elementary
 Hutchinson Middle School

References

External links
 Hutchinson High School

Public high schools in Minnesota
Schools in McLeod County, Minnesota